is a subdivision of the city of Minamiuonuma, Niigata, Japan. It was formerly a village. Urasa Station played a major role in transportation for the local people in modern times. 

Urasa is a home for enthusiasts of the local naked festival.

External links 
 Urasa Map

Dissolved municipalities of Niigata Prefecture